(von) Falkenskiold is a Danish and Norwegian noble family of high nobility that descends from a medieval Danish patrician family the Düssel (Dyssel) family who were members of the Rigsrådet. The Falkenskiold family today are large landowners in Denmark.

History
The Falkenskiold family descends from State Councillor and County Governor Arnold Christian Düssel (ca. 1650-1714) of the influential burgher Düssel (Dyssel) family, he  owned Sejlstrupgård Estate. His sons, Martin Düssel (ca. 1690-1746) and Christoffer Düssel (ca. 1698-1770)  were both by letters patent on 3 August 1716 ennobled  as højere brevadel (New Nobility of the Higher Part) and Sværadlen (Sword Nobility) under the name von Falkenskiold (‘of Falcons Shield'). In 1890 the family were elevated to Friherres Falkenskiold.  

The Falkenskiold branch that exists today descends from their progenitor Martin Düssel (Dyssel) von Falkenskiold.

Christoffer Düssel von Falkenskiold
In his marriage with Else Sophie Bartholin, the younger brother Christoffer Düssel von Falkenskiold got one daughter, Else Margrethe von Falkenskiold (1737–1801), who married Constantin August Charisisius to Constantinsborg.

Martin Düssel von Falkenskiold
Martin Düssel von Falkenskiold married the noblewoman Dorthe Sophia von Schack of Kjærstrup and Bramsløkke (1710–1772) with whom he had three daughters and two sons; General Seneca Otto von Falkenskiold (1742–1820) and Colonel, Noble courtier and major landowner.  Arnoldus von Falkenskiold (1744–1819) of Sæbygård and Sophienberg. Arnoldus von Falkenskiold's marriage with noblewoman Elisabeth Sehested of Broholm and Sæbygård(b. 1751) gave the son Courtier Anders Sehested von Falkenskiold of Sæbygård (1781–1841) who married the noblewoman Cathrine Hedevig de Leth (b. 1782) daughter of Lieutenant General Johan Frederik de Leth (1737-1817). They had seven sons from whom two lines of the Baronial family exist today.

Property
Members of the Falkenskiold family have owned a number of large estates and manor houses in Denmark which include: 
 Sæbygård Estate 
 Sæbygård Castle
 Falkenhøj Manor
 Lundsgaard Estate
 Frihedslund Manor
 Sophienberg Castle 
 Eriksholm Castle
 Constantinsborg Manor

Members of the Falkenskiold family have owned large landholdings in the Central Denmark Region  and Zealand Region since the late 1700s.

See also
 Danish nobility
 Norwegian nobility

References

Literature
 Dansk Adelskalender (1878): Falkenskiold at skislekt.no/adel.

Danish noble families
Norwegian noble families